Cadeilhan is a commune in the Gers department in southwestern France.

Geography
The river Auroue forms most of the commune's western border.

Population

See also
Communes of the Gers department

References

Communes of Gers